was a Japanese pharmacologist and chemist. He was known for his discovery of EPR effect. He published more than 650 papers in reputed journals; the h-index is 115 (Google scholar).

Education and career
Maeda studied at Tohoku University with a bachelor's degree in 1962, at the University of California, Davis with a master's degree in 1964, and a doctorate in 1967 at Tohoku. 
He was a post-doctoral at the Sidney Farber Cancer Institute of Harvard University from 1967 to 1971, he also acquired the medical doctorate there.

From 1971 to 1980 he was an assistant professor at Kumamoto University and became a professor from 1980.

Research
Maeda developed the neocarzinostatin "SMANCS" with a copolymer of styrene and maleic acid in 1979. Afterward, Maeda and his student Yasuhiro Matsumura discovered the Enhanced permeability and retention effect (ERP effect) of macromolecular drugs in 1986, which laid an important foundation for the cancer-targeted therapy (CAncer Stromal Targeting; CAST).

Recognition
Maeda was awarded Princess Takamatsu Cancer Research Fund Prizes, Commemorative Gold Medal of E.K.Frey-E.Werle, Life Time Achievement Award of Royal Pharmaceutical Society, CRS College of Fellows Award, Nagai Innovation Award for Outstanding Achievement (2013), and Clarivate Citation Laureates (2016).

He was also a member of Controlled Release Society.

References

External links
Biography on the occasion of a lecture at the 9th Drug Delivery Summit 2016

1938 births
2021 deaths
Japanese pharmacologists
Japanese immunologists
People from Hyōgo Prefecture
Tohoku University alumni
University of California, Davis alumni
Academic staff of Sojo University
Harvard University faculty
Academic staff of Kumamoto University